Erem may refer to:

 Moshe Erem (1896-1978), Israeli politician
 Tim Erem  (born 1990), Swedish director
 Tunç Erem (born 1938), Turkish academic

See also
 Érimón

Turkish-language surnames
Turkish masculine given names